Sir Herbert Springet, 1st Baronet (ca. 1613 – 5 January 1662) was an English politician who sat in the House of Commons at various times between 1646 and 1662.

Life
Springet was the eldest son of Sir Thomas Springet of Broyle Place and his wife Mary Bellingham, daughter of John Bellingham of Erringham, Shoreham. He was educated at Hawkhurst Grammar School under Mr Godwin and was admitted at Christ's College, Cambridge on 3 July 1628, aged 15. He was a student of Middle Temple in 1630 and travelled abroad in France in 1635.

In 1646 Springet was elected Member of Parliament (MP) for New Shoreham as a replacement in the Long Parliament and held the seat until he was excluded in Pride's Purge in 1648. He was also an MP for Sussex in the First Protectorate Parliament from 1654 to 1655.

In April 1660 Springet was again elected MP for New Shoreham in the Convention Parliament. Springet became a Baronet of Broyle Place, Sussex 8 January 1661. It became extinct on his death. In 1661 he was elected MP for Shoreham again for the Cavalier Parliament.

Springet died in 1662 aged 48.

His daughter Barbara married Sir William Thomas, 1st Baronet MP for Seaford and Sussex.

References

1610s births
1662 deaths
Year of birth uncertain
Baronets in the Baronetage of England
English MPs 1640–1648
English MPs 1654–1655
English MPs 1660
English MPs 1661–1679